The U.S. state of Georgia first required its residents to register their motor vehicles and display license plates in 1910. Plates are currently issued by the Motor Vehicle Division of the Georgia Department of Revenue. Only rear plates have been required since 1942.

Passenger baseplates

1910 to 1970
The 1956 (dated 1957) issue was the first Georgia license plate that fully complied with these standards: the 1954 (dated 1955) and 1955 (dated 1956) issues were 6 inches in height by 12 inches in width, but had non-standard mounting holes.

1971 to present

County coding
Georgia used two sets of numeric county codes on its license plates between 1957 and 1970. On both sets, the order of the codes was based on the respective populations of each county, with the order of the codes from 1962 onwards based on the figures according to the 1960 United States Census.

Since 1971, the name of the county of issuance has been displayed at the bottom of each plate – originally on a sticker, before becoming screened in 2012.

Non-passenger and optional types

Georgia was one of the first states to issue optional plates, introducing commemorative issues for several of its in-state colleges and universities in 1983.  The only requirement is a minimum of 1000 plates ordered, thus the state has made plates for fans of Auburn University in Alabama and Clemson University in South Carolina.

The number of optional types has increased since 1983; Georgia currently offers many specialty or optional license plates, most at an extra cost to motorists.  Revenue from the sale of specialty plates is shared with the sponsoring organization, provided that the sponsor is an in-state Georgia college or an organization which has been authorized to receive revenue by an act of the legislature. Organizations which have not received legislative authorization, and out of state colleges, are not eligible to receive revenue from specialty tag sales.

Effective with the 2005 base, the state streamlined the ever-growing number of limited-issuance plates by instituting two-letter prefixes for almost all types other than standard passenger plates. Most of these plate types first appeared on the www.GEORGIA.gov base and are currently migrating to the new GEORGIA.gov base.

The state also issues plates for non-passenger vehicles, such as trucks, school buses, and government vehicles.

References

Further reading
 Georgia license plates 1969-present

External links

Georgia
Georgia (U.S. state) transportation-related lists
Transportation in Georgia (U.S. state)